|tries={{#expr:

 + 1 + 6 + 5 + 5 + 4 + 2 + 6 + 5 + 0 + 4 + 4 + 2 + 3 + 4 + 2 + 1 + 6 + 2 + 6 + 0 + 1 + 2 + 2 + 2
 + 9 + 0 + 1 + 1 + 6 + 2 + 4 + 3 + 3 + 3 + 2 + 1 + 2 + 1 + 4 + 3 + 4 + 2 + 1 + 3 + 0 + 2 + 7 + 3
 + 1 + 7 + 5 + 0 + 6 + 4 + 7 + 4 + 3 + 4 + 3 + 4 + 4 + 5 + 1 + 2 + 3 + 2 + 1 + 0 + 4 + 5 + 2 + 4
 + 4 + 1 + 5 + 4 + 6 + 2 + 2 + 3 + 6 + 0 + 2 + 1 + 2 + 3 + 1 + 5 + 4 + 1 + 3 + 1 + 3 + 3 + 1 + 2

 
 
 
}}
|top point scorer=  Antoine Hastoy (La Rochelle)50 points
|top try scorer=  Josh van der Flier (Leinster)5 tries
|venue=Aviva Stadium, Dublin
|attendance2=
|champions=
|count=
|runner-up=
|website=http://www.epcrugby.com
|previous year=2021–22
|previous tournament=2021–22 European Rugby Champions Cup
|next year=2023–24
|next tournament=2023–24 European Rugby Champions Cup
}}

The 2022–23 European Rugby Champions Cup is the ninth season of the European Rugby Champions Cup, the annual club rugby union competition run by European Professional Club Rugby (EPCR) for teams from the top five nations in European rugby and South Africa. It is the 28th season of pan-European professional club rugby competition.

Dutch beer brand Heineken continued as the title sponsor of the competition, extending their deal after their previous agreement expired at the end of the 2021–22 season.

This is the first year to feature the top teams from South Africa, following the inaugural United Rugby Championship season.

The tournament commenced in December 2022. The final is due to be held at Aviva Stadium in Dublin, Ireland on May 20, 2023.

Teams 
Twenty-four clubs from the three major European domestic and regional leagues compete in the Champions Cup. 

The distribution of teams is:

 England: eight clubs
 The top eight clubs from Premiership Rugby
 France: eight clubs
 The top eight clubs from the Top 14
 Ireland, Italy, Scotland, South Africa, Wales: eight clubs
 The top side in each of the four regional shields from the United Rugby Championship (one Irish, one Welsh, one South African and one either Scottish or Italian), along with the remaining top four ranked clubs regardless of nation, within the league, that didn't win their respective shield. If the club that wins the championship has not qualified by the methods above then that club, the four shield winners and the remaining top three ranked clubs regardless of nation, within the league, that didn't win their respective shield will qualify.

The following teams have qualified for the tournament as of 30 May 2022.

Team details 
Below is the list of coaches, captain and stadiums with their method of qualification for each team.

Note: Placing shown in brackets, denotes standing at the end of the regular season for their respective leagues, with their end of season positioning shown through CH for Champions, RU for Runner-up, SF for losing Semi-finalist, and QF for losing Quarter-finalist.

Seedings and structure 
For the purposes of the pool draw, the 24 clubs were separated into tiers based on their league finishing position, and clubs from the same league in the same tier were not drawn into the same pool. The number 1 and number 2 ranked clubs from each league are in Tier 1, the number 3 and number 4 ranked clubs are in Tier 2, the number 5 and 6 ranked clubs are in Tier 3, and the number 7 and number 8 ranked clubs are in Tier 4.

In effect, each pool contains one team from each of the three leagues, from each of the four tiers.

Pool play will feature the Tier 1 teams playing the Tier 4 teams in their pool twice, home and away, while the Tier 2 and 3 clubs will follow in a similar manner. However a team will not play the relevant team from its own league i.e. the tier 1 French team will play the tier 4 English and tier 4 URC team in its pool, but will not play the tier 4 French team in its pool. Each team will therefore play four pool games over four match weekends.

As with the previous two seasons, the 24 teams will play four rounds of pool matches. These will take place from 9–18 December 2022 and 13–22 January 2023. Sixteen teams will qualify for the knockout rounds. In a change from the 2021–22 format, the round of 16 contests will take the form of a single match rather than a two-legged tie.

The eight teams from each pool with the best points will qualify for the knockout stage, a single-leg single-elimination bracket of 16 teams. Teams finishing 9th and 10th after pool play will join the Challenge Cup, also at the round of 16 stage (joining twelve qualifiers from the Challenge Cup pool stage), once more in a single-leg single-elimination bracket. Last season's home-and-away two legged last 16 round has not been continued.

Pool stage 

Teams were awarded four points for a win, two for a draw, one bonus point for scoring four tries in a game, and one bonus point for losing by less than eight points.

Pool A

Pool B

Knockout stage 
The knockout stage is due to begin with the round of 16, starting on 31 March 2023, and concluding with the final on 20 May 2023.

Unlike the previous year, the round of 16 is planned to consist of a single leg of matches, consisting of the top eight ranked teams from Pool A and Pool B respectively, with the top four from each receiving home advantage.

Whilst the round of 16 follows a pre-determined format, the quarter-finals include an expected home advantage to the higher ranked team. The semi-finals are to be played at a neutral venue.

Bracket

Round of 16

Quarter-finals

Semi-finals
Both semi-finals will be played in Europe and the highest-ranked clubs from the pool stage will have home country advantage. In the event that a South African team is higher ranked, the game will still be located in Europe.

Final

Leading scorers 
Note: Flags to the left of player names indicate national team as has been defined under World Rugby eligibility rules, or primary nationality for players who have not yet earned international senior caps. Players may hold one or more non-WR nationalities.

Most points 

Source:

Most tries 

Source:

See also
 2022–23 EPCR Challenge Cup

Notes

References 

Champions Cup
European Rugby Champions Cup seasons